David Nalbandian was the defending champion, but did not participate this year.

Olivier Rochus won the title, defeating Kristof Vliegen 6–4, 6–2 in the all Belgian final.

Seeds

  Guillermo Coria (first round)
  Mario Ančić (first round)
  Jarkko Nieminen (semifinals)
  Tommy Haas (first round)
  Olivier Rochus (champion)
  Paradorn Srichaphan (first round)
  Mikhail Youzhny (first round)
  Florent Serra (first round)

Draw

Finals

Top half

Bottom half

External links
 2006 BMW Open draw
 2006 BMW Open Qualifying draw

Singles